The Benjamin Holt House is a private home in Stockton, California. Built in 1869, it was added to the National Register of Historic Places in 1982.

History 

The home was purchased by Benjamin Brown for his family. When Benjamin Holt, a business man whose family-held companies would eventually merge to form the Caterpillar Tractor Company, married Brown's daughter Anna, Holt moved into their family home. At the time that Brown purchased the house, it was adjacent to the El Dorado Brewing Company and diagonally across from the state mental hospital.

The house is a two-story, Colonial Revival, wood-frame structure, that has had numerous additions since it was first built. A garage was added in 1904 to house the family's new car.

Part of the property has served as Boy Scout Headquarters — Forty Niner Council, including in 1980.

References

		
National Register of Historic Places in San Joaquin County, California
Colonial Revival architecture in California
Houses completed in 1869